Plouaret-Trégor station (French: Gare de Plouaret-Trégor) is a railway station serving the town Plouaret, Côtes-d'Armor department, western France. It is situated on the Paris–Brest railway and the branch line to Lannion.

Services

The station is served by high speed trains to Brest, Rennes and Paris, and regional trains to Brest, Lannion, Saint-Brieuc and Rennes.

See also 

 List of SNCF stations in Brittany

References

Railway stations in Côtes-d'Armor
TER Bretagne
Railway stations in France opened in 1865